The second HaSharon Mall entrance suicide bombing was a suicide bombing which occurred on July 12, 2005 in the HaSharon Mall in Netanya, Israel. 5 people were killed in the attack.

The Palestinian Islamist militant organization Islamic Jihad claimed responsibility for the attack.

Attack
During the late afternoon of July 12, 2005 a Palestinian suicide bomber approached the popular HaSharon Mall in the center of the coastal city Netanya. The suicide bomber who was wearing hidden explosives underneath his clothes, detonated himself at about 6:35 pm on a pedestrian crossing, after approaching a group of four young women, who were crossing the road.

Three women were killed in the attack.  An IDF corporal and another woman subsequently died of their injuries. In addition, about 90 people were injured in the attack, five of them seriously. The explosion which occurred in a busy intersection outside of the mall during the evening rush hour also caused damage to many of the nearby automobiles, and in addition, some of the shopping center's windows were shattered.

After the attack the local police stated that the suicide bomber carried around 10 kg of explosives, as well as nails and metal pellets, on an explosive belt that was strapped to his body. Netanya's mayor, Miriam Fierberg, was present on the scene of the attack and immediately began assisting the injured.

The perpetrators 
The Palestinian Islamist militant organization Islamic Jihad claimed responsibility for the attack and stated that the attack was carried out by 18-year-old Palestinian student Ahmad Abu-Halil from the West Bank village of Atil.

Aftermath 
On the day of the bombing, Israeli defense minister, Shaul Mofaz, canceled a meeting with the Palestinian minister for civil affairs, Mohammed Dahlan, set for that evening to coordinate various issues regarding Israel's withdrawal from the Gaza Strip.

Official reactions 
Involved parties

 The Israeli government alleged that the Palestinian Authority (PA) is not doing enough to stop terrorism. David Baker, an official in the office of Prime minister Ariel Sharon, stated that "Israel has done all it could to ease up Palestinian needs but the PA has not fulfilled obligations undertaken at Sharm el-Sheikh and shows no signs of doing so".

:
 The Palestinian Authority condemned the attack. PA official Jibril Rajoub called it "hurtful to our cause" and chief negotiator Saeb Erakat stated that "those who carried out this attack want to sabotage the efforts being exerted to have a smooth and peaceful disengagement from Gaza and a revival of the peace process".

See also
 The first HaSharon Mall entrance suicide bombing
 The third HaSharon Mall entrance suicide bombing

References

External links 

Suicide bombing at Netanya shopping mall - published at the Israeli Ministry of Foreign Affairs
 Bomber kills three at Israeli mall - published in CNN on July 12, 2005
 Fourth Netanya victim dies - published in Ynet on July 13, 2005
 Netanya bombing death toll rises to 5 - published in Ynet on July 14, 2005

Mass murder in 2005
Netanya
Terrorist attacks attributed to Palestinian militant groups
Suicide bombing in the Israeli–Palestinian conflict
Terrorist incidents in Israel in 2005
July 2005 events in Asia
Shopping mall bombings
Building bombings in Israel
Islamic terrorism in Israel